The 1877 Columbia football team represented Columbia University in the 1877 college football season.

Schedule

References

Columbia
Columbia Lions football seasons
Columbia football